Khamnung Kikoi Louonbi is a primordial goddess in Meitei mythology and religion. She is the divine feminine personification of the death. She carries off the souls of people to the underworld when the time allotted to them to live had expired. If any soul is not willing to accompany her, then she will either serve it a false magical fruit to agree with her conducts or transform herself into the looks of a person, who is the dearest to the soul, especially that of mother, and persuade it (the soul). By any means, she will bring the souls of the dead people to the netherworld. She is the consort of Thongalel, the God of the death and the ruler of the underworld. She is said to be created from the very body of Salailen Sidaba, the Supreme Being.

See also 
 Thongalen
 Laikhurembi

References

External links 

 A Critical Study Of The Religious Philosophy

Arts deities
Arts goddesses
Beauty deities
Beauty goddesses
Death deities
Death goddesses
Fortune deities
Fortune goddesses
Leima
Life-death-rebirth deities
Life-death-rebirth goddesses
Liminal deities
Liminal goddesses
Love and lust deities
Love and lust goddesses
Magic deities
Magic goddesses
Maintenance deities
Maintenance goddesses
Meitei deities
Music and singing deities
Music and singing goddesses
Names of God in Sanamahism
Nature deities
Nature goddesses
Peace deities
Peace goddesses
Time and fate deities
Time and fate goddesses
Trickster deities
Trickster goddesses
Underworld deities
Underworld goddesses
Wisdom deities
Wisdom goddesses